College Scoreboard was a program that aired on NFL Network that debuted in 2006, and ended in 2007. The program was hosted by Paul Burmeister with analysis from Butch Davis and Mike Mayock.

History
College Scoreboard debuted in 2006 as a show on NFL Network dedicated to college football. It features news, highlights, statistics, interviews, press conferences and analysis.

In the first season Butch Davis was an analyst along with Mike Mayock, but was named as the head coach of North Carolina.

NFL Network original programming
2006 American television series debuts
2007 American television series endings
American sports television series
College football studio shows